Khunti is the headquarter of Khunti district in the Indian state of Jharkhand.
It is in South Chotanagpur division and one of the 24 districts in the Indian state of Jharkhand. The district of Khunti was carved out of Ranchi district on 12 September 2007. It is historically known as the centre of activity of the Birsa movement. As of 2011, it is the second least populous district of Jharkhand (out of 24), after Lohardaga.
The district is a part of the Red Corridor.

Geography

Location

Climate
The climate is tropical rain forest. Maximum rainfall takes place during the months from July to September that accounts for more than 90% of total rainfall in the state.

Area overview
In the adjacent map the area shown is “undulating and covered with hills, hillocks and jungles (jungles/ forests are shown as shaded area in the map). The soil of the area is rocky, sandy and red loam upland. There are paddy fields only in the depressions. In 2011, it had a density of population of 210 persons per sq km. Khunti is an overwhelmingly rural district with 91.5% of the population living in rural areas. Famous places in this area are Ulihatu, the birth place of Bhagwan Birsa Munda, and Dombari Buru, the central point of his activity.

Note: The map alongside presents some of the notable locations in the district. All places marked in the map are linked in the larger full screen map.

Demographics
 India census, Khunti had a population of 36,390. Males constitute 52% of the population and females 48%. Khunti has an average literacy rate of 83.12%, higher than the national average of 73.00%: male literacy is 88.65%, and female literacy is 77.39%. In Khunti, 13.09% of the population is under 6 years of age.

Utility services 
There is a lack of utility services of water supply due to which people dug open wells in every house or the use of hand pumps for water procurement. Postal services have proved to be much efficient.

Healthcare

There is a civil hospital at Khunti with facilities for providing medical facilities to the public.

Transport

By Air 
Birsa Munda Airport in Ranchi is the nearest airport. It is around 33 km from Khunti.

By Rail 

There is no railway station in Khunti. The nearest station to Khunti is Hatia railway station. Most people use bus or taxi services to reach Hatia Railway Station or Ranchi Railway Station.

Tourist attractions 

Panchghagh Falls :
Panchghagh Falls is located around 15 km from Khunti in a place on way to Khunti-Chaibasa. These five falls originate from high altitudes and the foot of the falls is picnic spot, to have the experience of bath under the gushing water.

Deer Park : The park has a number of gardens, pathways and playing parks for children. The main attraction here is the park safari.

Angrabadi Temple : Angrabadi is a temple complex near Khunti. The temple was renamed as Amreshwar Dham by the Sage Shankaracharya Swami Swarupananda Saraswathi. The temples enclose the Hindu Gods such as Lord Shiva, Lord Ganesh, Rama-Sita and Hanuman.

Perwaghag   : One of the waterfalls in Jharkhand, located in the forest near Torpa block. In rainy season it is inaccessible. But, in winter around Christmas and New Year it is a common picnic spot.

St. Michael's Church, Khunti One of the oldest church in Khunti St. Michael's Church (colloquially called Michel) is one of Khunti's five Lutheran main churches (Hauptkirchen) and the most famous church in the city. St. Michaelis is a landmark of the city and it is considered to be one of the finest Hanseatic Protestant baroque churches. The church was purposely built Protestant unlike many other Hamburg churches which were originally built by Roman Catholics and were converted to Protestantism during the Reformation. It is dedicated to the Archangel Michael. A large bronze statue, standing above the portal of the church shows the archangel conquering the devil.

The 132-meter high Baroque spire totally covered with copper is a prominent feature of Hamburg's skyline and has always been a landfall mark for ships sailing up the river Elbe.

Festival and dances
Khunti is home to people of many castes, creeds and sects. Festivals are celebrated with pomp, glory and in harmony specially local festivals like Faghun, Sarhul, Dasain, Tusu, Karam etc.

Jadur Susun, Karam Susun (dance)
Basically people are known Adiwasi dance but actually its name are Jadur Susun (Dance), Karam Susun (Dance) etc. these dances are dancing occasionally.

Economy
Majority of the population is tribal in the Khunti sub-division and they are dependent on agriculture and forests for their livelihood. Lack of food security from the land has compelled many tribal families to migrate out of their own villages. This is despite the fact that the existing landholdings can provide stable livelihoods to the tribal families. Lack of land development, irrigation, credit, know-how for improved agriculture, access to market etc. act as serious constraints leading to a large number of impoverished tribal families.
 
The area however is endowed with good rainfall - in most blocks the annual rainfall exceeds 1100 mm. There are numerous small rivers, rivulets and streams, which carry water up to the month of February or March. In spite of that, most cultivated lands do not have assurance of water for crops even during the monsoon. Inadequacy of water harvesting infrastructures and water use systems have allowed the rain water to run off through the streams to downstream areas beyond the State, leaving the lands here dry.
 
It has been long argued that ensuring water assurance to crops and improving land husbandry practices could go a long way in improving the livelihoods of poor families and impacting the local economy in rural areas. However, it has also been the experience that timely credit in adequate amount and know-how for improved agriculture are also essential along with water assurance to crops. For water assurance, the large irrigation schemes have not been successful in the district and other parts of Jharkhand.
 
The area is known for the Lac cultivation. A large part of the India's total lac production comes from this area. Lac, a natural polymer (resin) is produced by a tiny insect, Kerria lacca (Kerr), which is purposely cultured on shoots of several species of trees, mainly palas, kusum and ber. This agricultural profession of lac cultivation is a subsidiary source of income for a large number of families in the area.
 
A number of development agencies are active in the area, prominent among which is a national level development organization called PRADAN, with an office in Torpa road. Others are missionary organizations such as, NBJK, and SGVS.

See also
Khunti district

References

Further reading 

Cities and towns in Khunti district